Aung Khaing Win is a bodybuilder affiliated with the Myanmar Bodybuilding and Physique Sports Federation.

He won the gold medal at the 2007 Southeast Asia Games and at SEA Championships 2013. And, he was four-time winner of Mr.olympic.

Career
Aung Khaing Win won the gold medal in a competition at the Bodybuilding 70 kg category 
at the 2007 Southeast Asian Games, which was held at the 70th Anniversary Hall, Nakhon Ratchasima Rajabhat University , Nakhon Ratchasima, Thailand.

In 2013, he won gold medal in a competition at the Bodybuilding 60 kg category at the 2013 Southeast Asian Games was held at Myanmar Convention Center, Yangon, Myanmar between 12–16 December.

Competitive placings

2013 SEA Bodybuilding Championships
2012	SEA Championships 5th — Men Bodybuilding 75 kg
2011	Asian and World Bodybuilding & Physique Sports Championships8th — Asian Men Bodybuilding 70 kg
2009	South East Asian Championships 4th — Men Bodybuilding 70 kg
 2009 Asian Championships 6th — Men Bodybuilding 70 kg
2007 SEA Bodybuilding Championships

References

Burmese bodybuilders
Living people
Professional bodybuilders
People from Yangon
Burmese male bodybuilders
Year of birth missing (living people)